Arthur Airport  is a public airport located one mile (2 km) northeast of the central business district of Arthur, a city in Cass County, North Dakota, United States. It is owned by the Arthur Airport Authority.

Facilities and aircraft 
For the 12-month period ending July 31, 2007, the airport had 510 aircraft operations, an average of 43 per month: 98% general aviation and 2% air taxi.

See also 
 List of airports in North Dakota

References

External links 
 Arthur (1A2) at North Dakota Aeronautics Commission

Airports in North Dakota
Buildings and structures in Cass County, North Dakota
Transportation in Cass County, North Dakota